Alsa is an unincorporated community in Van Zandt County, Texas, United States. According to the Handbook of Texas, the community had a population of 30 in 2000. It is located within the Dallas/Fort Worth Metroplex.

History
A post office was established at Alsa in 1894 and remained in operation until 1907. One source says that the community was named by Confederate veteran Bill Starnes, who opened a store shortly after the American Civil War and named it for a girl he fell in love with. Its population zenith was 50 in 1896; at that time, the community had a combination cotton gin and gristmill, a general store, and Baptist and Methodist churches. It had two businesses, a church, and Howell Cemetery in 1936. Both businesses closed by 1964, causing the population to drop to 15. Farming and livestock were the most common commodities in the community. Locals grew fruits, vegetables, and cotton as the main crops, while dairy and beef cattle, hogs, and poultry were raised. Only scattered houses remained in Alsa in 1979, but its population was recorded as 30 in 2000.

Geography

Education
Alsa had a school called Center School that was established sometime after 1890. It had 75 students in 1904 and continued to operate in 1936. It joined the Wills Point Independent School District in the early 1950s.

References

Unincorporated communities in Van Zandt County, Texas
Unincorporated communities in Texas